Dr. J. R. Mosier Office is a historic medical office located at Meadville, Crawford County, Pennsylvania.  It was built about 1890, and is a small, clapboard clad frame building.  It features a false front in front of a gable roof. The interior consists of three rooms furnished as they were in 1938; a waiting room, examination room, and pharmacy.  The building was moved to the Baldwin-Reynolds House property in 1975 from its original location in the village of Littles Corners about 7 miles northwest of Meadville.  The office is maintained as a medical museum by the Crawford County Historical Society.

It was added to the National Register of Historic Places in 1976.

References

Commercial buildings on the National Register of Historic Places in Pennsylvania
Commercial buildings completed in 1890
Museums in Crawford County, Pennsylvania
Meadville, Pennsylvania
Mosier
National Register of Historic Places in Crawford County, Pennsylvania